Rogue Leader may refer to:
 Star Wars Rogue Squadron II: Rogue Leader, a video game for the GameCube
 X-Wing: Rogue Leader, a three-part comic book series

See also
 Rogue Leaders: The Story of LucasArts
 Rogue One, the first Star Wars Anthology film
 Rogue Squadron, where the Rogue Leader Star Wars X-wing pilot character is covered